Steve Reid (January 29, 1944 – April 13, 2010) was an American jazz drummer who played with Miles Davis, Ornette Coleman, James Brown, Fela Kuti, Kieran Hebden, and Sun Ra. He worked as a session drummer for Motown.

Biography 
Born in the South Bronx, Reid started drumming at 16. His family moved to Queens, New York, three blocks away from John Coltrane. Before attending Adelphi University in Garden City, New York, he worked as part of the Apollo Theatre House Band and recorded with Martha and the Vandellas under the direction of Quincy Jones.

In 1969, Reid refused to register for the draft during the Vietnam War. He was arrested as a conscientious objector and sentenced to a four-year prison sentence at Lewisburg Federal Penitentiary, where he served with Jimmy Hoffa. After his release on parole in 1971, Reid found work as a session musician with Dionne Warwick, Horace Silver, Charles Tyler, Sun Ra, and Freddie Hubbard, in addition to Broadway stage work.

In 1974, Reid formed the Legendary Master Brotherhood and his record label, Mustevic Sound.

He lived in Lugano, Switzerland, for several years in later life and released several recordings for the English label Soul Jazz and the German label CPR. For his final albums, his band included Chuck Henderson (soprano saxophone), Boris Netsvetaev (piano), and Chris Lachotta (double-bass).

In 2006, Reid and electronic musician Kieran Hebden, recorded the experimental album The Exchange Session Vol. 1. The duo enjoyed this collaboration so much that they recorded three more albums: The Exchange Session Vol. 2 (2006), Tongues (2007), and NYC (2008). In an interview, Reid referred to Hebden as his "musical soul mate".

On April 13, 2010, Reid died in New York of throat cancer.

Discography

As leader
 Rhythmatism (Mustevic, 1976)
 Nova (Mustevic, 1976)
 Odyssey of the Oblong Square (Mustevic, 1977)
 Raw Material with Per Henrik Wallin, Kevin Ross (Dragon, 1983)
 A Drum Story (Altrisuoni, 2001)
 Waves (C. P., 2003)
 Spirit Walk (Soul Jazz, 2005)
 Daxaar (Recorded in Africa) (Domino, 2007)

With Kieran Hebden
 The Exchange Session Vol. 1 (Domino, 2006)
 The Exchange Session Vol. 2 (Domino, 2006)
 Tongues (Domino, 2007)
 NYC (Domino, 2008)
 Live at the South Bank (Smalltown Superjazzz, 2011)

As sideman
With Arthur Blythe
 The Grip (India Navigation, 1977)
 Metamorphosis (India Navigation, 1979)

With James Brown
 The Popcorn (1969)

With Ted Daniel
 In the Beginning (Altura, 1975)

With Miles Davis
 Tutu (1986)

With Fela Ransome Kuti	
 Africa One

With Frank Lowe	 
 Fresh (1975)
 Out Loud (2014)

With Martha and the Vandellas	  
"Dancing in the Street" (Motown, 1964)

With Charles Tyler
 Voyage from Jericho (1975)
 Live in Europe (Umea, 1977)
 Saga of the Outlaws (Nessa, 1978)
 Folk and Mystery Stories (Sonet, 1980)
 Definite Volume 1 (Storyville, 1982)
 Definite Volume 2 (Storyville, 1984)
 At WKCR (2014)

With others
 Lorraine Feather, The Body Remembers (Bean Bag, 1996)
 Jackiem Joyner, Lil' Man Soul (Artistry, 2009)
 Dave Koz, Dave Koz (Capitol, 1990)
 Nelson Rangell, In Every Moment (GRP, 1992)
 Richard Smith, From My Window (Brainchild, 1994)

References

External links

Steve Reid article at the BBC
Steve Reid article at Prefix Magazine
Steve Reid article at Exclaim, February 2008
Steve Reid interview at Domino Recording Company
Steve Reid interview with P Sullivan at Wax Poetics

1944 births
2010 deaths
Adelphi University alumni
American conscientious objectors
Avant-garde jazz musicians
American jazz drummers
People from Queens, New York
Jazz musicians from New York (state)
People from Lugano
Deaths from throat cancer
Deaths from cancer in New York (state)
Spiritual jazz musicians